Georg Hendrik Christiaan Bodenhausen (11 July 1905, Utrecht – 1 October 1997, Lausanne) was a Dutch civil servant. He was director of the United International Bureaux for the Protection of Intellectual Property (BIRPI) from 1963 to 1970, and the first director-general of the World Intellectual Property Organization (WIPO) from 1970 to 1973.

Bibliography 
Guide to the Application of the Paris Convention for the Protection of Industrial Property As Revised at Stockholm in 1967 (United International Bureaux For the Protection of Intellectual Property (BIRPI); World Intellectual Property Organization (WIPO); February 1, 1968)

References

External links

1905 births
World Intellectual Property Organization people
People from Utrecht (city)
1997 deaths
20th-century Dutch lawyers
Dutch officials of the United Nations